Coletta is a surname. Notable people with the surname include:

 Chris Coletta (born 1944), professional baseball player
 Chris Coletta (cyclist) (born 1972), American former cyclist
 Damiano Coletta, (born 1960), Italian politician, physician and former footballer
 Gabriela Coletta (born 1968), American politician
 Jacopo Coletta, (born 1992), Italian professional footballer 
 John Coletta (1932–2006), English music manager and music producer
 Kim Coletta, bassist for Jawbox
 Sabino Coletta (1914-?),  Argentine footballer

See also 
 Coletta (disambiguation)
 Colette (surname)

Italian-language surnames